Emericella discophora is a fungus. Its ascospores produce wide and entire, nonstellate equatorial crests. It was isolated from soil in Spain.

See also
Emericella filifera
Emericella olivicola
Emericella stella-maris

References

Trichocomaceae
Fungi described in 2008